The Episcopal Conference of Honduras is an institution of the Catholic Church that brings together the bishops of Honduras to establish policies and programs for pastoral government.

Function 
The Episcopal Conference of Honduras is a permanent institution of the Catholic Church whose membership comprises all the country's diocesan bishops and their peers, including coadjutors, auxiliaries, and emeriti. As a conference they jointly exercise some pastoral functions as the times and society require.

Episcopal conferences have long existed as informal bodies, but they were established as formal entities by the Second Vatican Council and implemented by Pope Paul VI in Ecclesiae Sanctae in 1966. Their work is governed by the Code of Canon Law and the nature of their magisterial authority was clarified by Pope John Paul II in Apostolos Suos in 1998.

Its leadership positions are filled by election in which all the members of the conference can participate. Current rules provide for a president to be elected to a three-year term, which can be renewed once.

Leadership
In June 2022, the Conference elected as president Roberto Camilleri, Bishop of Comayagüa, and as vice president Darwin Andino, bishop of Santa Rosa de Copán.

Presidents
 Héctor Enrique Santos Hernández, Archbishop of Tegucigalpa (1963 – 1993)
 Raúl Corriveau, Bishop of Choluteca (1993 – 1996)
 Óscar Rodríguez Maradiaga, Cardinal Archbishop of Tegucigalpa (1996 – 2016)
 Ángel Garachana, Bishop of San Pedro Sula) (2016 – 2022)
 He was vice president from 1996 to 2002
 Roberto Camilleri, Bishop of Comayagüa (2022 – 2025)

See also
Catholic Church in Honduras
List of Catholic dioceses in Honduras

References

External links
 GCatholic: Conferencia Episcopal de Honduras
 Suyapa Medios, the Catholic communication channel of Honduras 

Honduras
Christian organizations established in 1966
Catholic organizations established in the 20th century
Catholic Church in Honduras